Our World with Black Enterprise is a weekly television show which has been hosted by Paul Brunson, Edward Lansing Gordon III, and, during its first season, Marc Lamont Hill, which is produced by Black Enterprise, Inc. The show was created by Earl G. Graves Sr. It airs on Saturday and Sunday across a range of local television stations and focuses on various issues of interest to the urban (i.e. Black) general and upwardly mobile community. The show premiered on September 30, 2006. The show received negative criticism in Israel for comments, including those by Marc Lamont Hill, for supporting Palestinians viewed as terrorists by Israel.

The show has criticized superficial Black stereotypes, including Black entertainment programs such as Tyler Perry's sitcoms.

References

External links
 'Our World With Black Enterprise' to Premier Nov. 1 with New Hosts

Business-related television series
African-American news and public affairs television series
2014 American television series debuts